Cornelius Cole (September 17, 1822 – November 3, 1924) was an American politician who served a single term in the United States House of Representatives as a Republican representing California from 1863 to 1865, and another term in the United States Senate from 1867 to 1873.

Life
He graduated from Wesleyan University in 1847 and was admitted to the New York bar. In his lifetime he practiced law in his adopted state of California first in San Francisco, then in Sacramento. After returning to California following his retirement from national politics he practiced in San Francisco again and finally in Los Angeles with his eldest son Willoughby.

On March 8, 1856 Cole was one of the organizers of the California branch of the Republican Party, acting as secretary and writing the manifesto. The 22 men who signed the organizing document  included Edwin B. Crocker, the organizer of the new party, and Collis Huntington. From August 1856 to January 1857, Cole and James McClatchy edited the Sacramento Daily Times, which was printed in the 54 K Street offices of the Central Pacific Railroad. It was short lived lasting only a few months after the 1856 National election.

Additionally, he was nominated on the Republican ticket for Clerk of Sacramento Court, but failed to get elected. In 1858 he was elected as District Attorney of Sacramento County. In 1862 he and his family moved to Santa Cruz located on Monterey Bay. It was from there he went to the US Congress in 1863.

In 1880 he moved to southern California where he owned one of the original Spanish/Mexican landgrants, what is now known as Hollywood, then was dubbed Colegrove after his wife, Olive Colegrove. There are several streets now named after the family; Cole St., Willoughby Ave., Eleanor St. and Seward St.

The eastern California community of Coleville in Mono County is named for Cornelius Cole.

Cole's brother, George W. Cole, was a Union Army officer in the American Civil War who attained the rank of major general by brevet. After the war, George Cole was acquitted of the murder of L. Harris Hiscock, whom he accused of having an affair with Mrs. Cole.

References
Cornelius Cole, "Memoirs" (New York, 1908)
Catherine Coffin Phillips, "Cornelius Cole California Pioneer" (San Francisco, 1929)
Leonard L. Richards, "The California Gold Rush and the Coming of the Civil War" (New York 2007)

External links

1822 births
1924 deaths
Wesleyan University alumni
California lawyers
New York (state) lawyers
Editors of California newspapers
Republican Party United States senators from California
People of California in the American Civil War
American centenarians
Men centenarians
People from Lodi, New York
Burials at Hollywood Forever Cemetery
Republican Party members of the United States House of Representatives from California
19th-century American lawyers